KF Skrapari is an Albanian football club based in Çorovodë, Skrapar. The club is currently playing in the Kategoria e Tretë, which is the fourth tier of Albanian football.

History

5 Shtatori
Founded in 1959, the club was named 5 Shtatori (5 September) until the 2005-06 season.

Current squad

 

 (Captain)

References

Skrapari
Skrapar
Association football clubs established in 1959
1959 establishments in Albania
Albanian Third Division clubs